Under Construction is a 2003 album recorded by Amy Schugar, lead guitarist, singer, songwriter and bandleader from the San Francisco Bay Area, in collaboration with Michael Schenker. All the music on this album wrote Michael Schenker; the lyrics- and vocal-melodies are by Amy Schugar.

Schugar toured with the Michael Schenker Group; she has a new power trio and toured the Bay Area beginning in May 2007.

Track listing
"High Cost" - 3:12 
"I Need This Feeling" - 3:27
"Surrender" - 3:58 
"Back Through the Window" - 4:06 
"I Need You" - 2:44 
"Love & Danger" - 3:59 
"All I Got" - 3:54  
"Victim of the System" - 4:01

Japanese edition bonus track
"Even Though"

Personnel
Amy Schugar - lead vocals, lead guitar
Michael Schenker - lead and rhythm guitars, backing vocal
Fred Robinson - additional and lead guitar
Torry Edwards - violin
Mark Lehman - bass
Matt Indes - drums

External links
Amy Schugar

2003 albums
Rock albums by American artists
Collaborative albums
Michael Schenker albums